Around Whicker's World was a short-lived radio program that aired from March 1998-April 1998.  There were six half-hour episodes and it was broadcast on BBC Radio 2.  It starred Alan Whicker.

Notes and references
Lavalie, John. Around Whicker's World. EpGuides. 21 Jul 2005. 29 Jul 2005  <https://web.archive.org/web/20070814032749/http://www.epguides.com/AroundWhickersWorld/%3E.

BBC Radio 2 programmes